Boxing Match; or, Glove Contest is an 1896 British short black-and-white silent documentary film, produced and directed by Birt Acres for exhibition on Robert W. Paul's peep show Kinetoscopes, featuring a staged boxing match between Sergeant-Instructor Barrett and Sergeant Pope with a round, an interval and a knockout. The film was considered lost until footage from an 1896 Fairground Programme, originally shown in a portable booth at Hull Fair by Midlands photographer George Williams, donated to the National Fairground Archive was identified as being from this film.

Current status
Given its age, this short film is available to freely download from the Internet.

References

External links 
 

1890s British films
British black-and-white films
British boxing films
British silent short films
British short documentary films
Films directed by Birt Acres
1890s rediscovered films
1890s short documentary films
Rediscovered British films
British sports documentary films